Jyothi Nagar is a residential community in Kesavadasapuram, Thiruvananthapuram, Kerala, India.

Suburbs of Thiruvananthapuram